Aukan may refer to:

Aukan, Burma
Ndyuka people, who are also called "Aukan"
Ndyuka language, also called "Aukan"